Daur-e-Junoon (literal English translation: "the era of junoon") is the second live album and overall the twelfth album released by the Pakistani rock band, Junoon. The album was released on March 29, 2002.

The album consists of all the major live performances by the band and contains a new version of the 1990s hit, "Jazba-e-Junoon" and also the soundtrack, "Garaj Baras", of the bollywood movie Paap from their forthcoming album "Dewaar" by then. The name of the album came to Junoon's manager, Shehryar Ahmad. He incorrectly translated the English word for tour (as in concert tour, reflecting that it was a live album) as "Daur", connoting Junoon Tour, as "Daur-e-Junoon." (Daura-e-Junoon, sounded more like an epileptic fit, and sounded pejorative)

The album cover concept was also Shehryar's idea. An Indian fan had presented the band with an entire set of a Hindi comic series that he had authored, which featured Ali Salman and Brian as rock Superheroes saving the Earth. Shehryar asked him to draw the album cover, and then had a design agency finalise the cover package.

Track listing

Personnel
All information is taken from the CD.

Junoon
Salman Ahmad - vocals, lead guitar
Ali Azmat - vocals, backing vocals
Brian O'Connell - bass guitar, backing vocals

Additional musicians
Vocals on "Piya" by Morten Harket
Pyar Hai Zindagi featured Morten Harket

Production
Produced by Brian O'Connell
Engineered & Mixed by Brian O'Connell and John Alec
Tracks recorded at the Roskilde Festival, produced by Neils Ekner
Tracks recorded at the Roskilde Festival, recorded & mixed by Ossian Rhyner

External links
 Junoon's Official Website

Junoon (band) live albums
2002 live albums
Urdu-language albums